The Mitchell Daily Republic is a daily newspaper published in Mitchell, South Dakota.  The paper's circulation is reported to be 9,859 and primarily serves Davison County, South Dakota. It was founded in 1934 and is currently owned by the Forum Communications Company out of Fargo, North Dakota.

External links
 Mitchell Republic official website

See also
 List of newspapers in South Dakota

References

Forum Communications Company
Publications established in 1934
1934 establishments in South Dakota
Mitchell, South Dakota
Newspapers published in South Dakota
Mass media in the Mitchell, South Dakota micropolitan area